"Sweet Magnolia Blossom" is a song recorded by American country music artist Billy "Crash" Craddock. It was released in December 1973 as the third single from his album Mr. Country Rock. The song peaked at number 3 on the Billboard Hot Country Singles chart. It also reached number 1 on the RPM Country Tracks chart in Canada.  The song was written by Rory Bourke.

Chart performance

References

1973 singles
Billy "Crash" Craddock songs
Songs written by Rory Bourke
Song recordings produced by Ron Chancey
1973 songs
ABC Records singles